John Patrick Joyce (born February 8, 1957) is an American dermatologist and politician from the Commonwealth of Pennsylvania. He is a member of the Republican Party.

Early life and education 
Joyce was born and raised in Altoona, Pennsylvania. He graduated from Pennsylvania State University with his bachelor's degree and Temple University School of Medicine with his Doctor of Medicine. He completed his medical residency in internal medicine and dermatology at Johns Hopkins Hospital. Joyce is Roman Catholic.

U.S. House of Representatives

Elections

2018 

He won the Republican Party primary election against seven other candidates with 22% of the vote. The district had previously been the 9th, represented by nine-term incumbent Bill Shuster, who announced his retirement in January 2018; he and his father, Bud, had represented this district for 46 years. Like its predecessor, it is heavily Republican. Donald Trump won the old 9th in 2016 with 69% of the vote, his strongest showing in the state. He would have won the new 13th just as easily had it existed in 2016, with 71% of the vote. With a Cook Partisan Voting Index of R+22, on paper it was Pennsylvania's most Republican district.

Joyce won the general election against Brent Ottaway with 70.5% of the vote.

2020 

Joyce voted against the certification of the 2020 United States presidential election.

Joyce was reelected on November 3, 2020, with 73.5% of the vote.

2022

Tenure
In December 2020, Joyce was one of 126 Republican members of the House of Representatives to sign an amicus brief in support of Texas v. Pennsylvania, a lawsuit filed at the United States Supreme Court contesting the results of the 2020 presidential election, in which Joe Biden defeated incumbent Donald Trump. The Supreme Court declined to hear the case on the basis that Texas lacked standing under Article III of the Constitution to challenge the results of an election held by another state.

Immigration
Joyce voted against the Fairness for High-Skilled Immigrants Act of 2019 which would amend the Immigration and Nationality Act to eliminate the per-country numerical limitation for employment-based immigrants, to increase the per-country numerical limitation for family-sponsored immigrants, and for other purposes.

Joyce voted against the Further Consolidated Appropriations Act of 2020 which authorizes DHS to nearly double the available H-2B visas for the remainder of FY 2020.

Joyce voted against the Consolidated Appropriations Act (H.R. 1158), which effectively prohibits ICE from cooperating with Health and Human Services to detain or remove illegal alien sponsors of unaccompanied alien children (UACs).

Syria
In 2023, Joyce was among 47 Republicans to vote in favor of H.Con.Res. 21 which directed President Joe Biden to remove U.S. troops from Syria within 180 days.

Committee assignments
  Committee on Energy and Commerce
 Subcommittee on Health
 Subcommittee on Oversight and Investigations

Caucus memberships

 Army Caucus
 Auto Care Caucus
 Bus Caucus
 Dairy Caucus
 GOP Doctors Caucus
 Irish Caucus
 Paper and Packing Caucus
Republican Study Committee

Electoral history

References

External links
 Congressman John Joyce official U.S. House website
John Joyce for Congress

|-

1957 births
Living people
American dermatologists
American Roman Catholics
Catholics from Pennsylvania
Pennsylvania State University alumni
Politicians from Altoona, Pennsylvania
Republican Party members of the United States House of Representatives from Pennsylvania
21st-century American politicians
Temple University School of Medicine alumni
Physicians from Pennsylvania